Edwin George Smith (29 August 1848 – 5 April 1880) was an English cricketer.  Smith was a right-handed batsman who bowled right-arm medium pace.  He was born at Cheltenham, Gloucestershire.

Smith made his first-class debut for Gloucestershire against Nottinghamshire in 1875.  In this match, he scored 12 runs in Gloucestershire's first-innings, before being dismissed by William Clarke, with the match ending in a draw.  The following season he made his second and final first-class appearance for the county, against Yorkshire.  In this match, he scored 14 runs in Gloucestershire's first-innings, before being dismissed by Tom Armitage, while in their second-innings he was dismissed for a duck by Robert Clayton.

He died at the town of his birth on 5 April 1880.

References

External links
Edwin Smith at ESPNcricinfo
Edwin Smith at CricketArchive

1848 births
1880 deaths
Sportspeople from Cheltenham
English cricketers
Gloucestershire cricketers